Pedda Raveedu is a village in Prakasam district of the Indian state of Andhra Pradesh. It is the mandal headquarters of Peda Araveedu mandal Markapur revenue division.

References 

Villages in Prakasam district